William Gulston (1636-1684) was an English churchman, bishop of Bristol from 1679.

Life
Son of Nathaniel Gouldston D.D. of Wymondham, Leicestershire, he was educated at Grantham and was admitted sizar at St John's College, Cambridge in 1653. He graduated B.A. in 1658, M.A. in 1661, and D.D. in 1679.

Gulston was presented to the Church of St Faith, Havant in 1660 by the king. John Belchamber who had had the living under the Commonwealth was, however, reinstated in 1662. He was rector of Symondsbury, Dorset from 1670. As chaplain to Sarah, Duchess of Somerset, he became a protégé of Henry Somerset, 3rd Marquess of Worcester, a proto-tory, and became immersed in the city local politics of Bristol. After two years his position had become difficult.

He died on 4 April 1684 at Symondsbury and was buried there.

Family
His daughter Mary married Gilbert Budgell D.D., and was mother of Eustace Budgell. He was uncle to Joseph Addison, his sister Jane having married Lancelot Addison.

Notes

1636 births
1684 deaths
Bishops of Bristol
Alumni of St John's College, Cambridge
17th-century Church of England bishops